Shimon Shelah (born 19 March 1932) is an Israeli former basketball player. He competed in the men's tournament at the 1952 Summer Olympics.

References

External links
 

1932 births
Living people
Israeli men's basketball players
Olympic basketball players of Israel
Basketball players at the 1952 Summer Olympics
Place of birth missing (living people)
1954 FIBA World Championship players